Feser is a surname. Notable people with the surname include:

Edward Feser (born 1968), American philosopher, writer, and academic
Tara Feser (born 1980), Canadian wheelchair basketball player and Paralympian
Justin Feser (born 1992), Canadian ice hockey player

See also
Fesser

Surnames from nicknames